From Riches to Rags (Chinese: 錢作怪) is a 1980 Hong Kong film written and directed by John Woo starring Ricky Hui and Johnny Koo.

Plot
After buying a winning lottery ticket, factory workers Ah Ying and Fatso become millionaires overnight. However, a prediction by a fortune teller and a mix-up with a doctor leads Ah Ying to believe he is going to die from cancer. Not wanting to suffer, Ah Ying decides to commit suicide, but is afraid of it being painful. While on a rooftop, he meets a poor suicidal man, who gives all his money to Ah Ying, under the condition that he hires a hitman to kill him. When Ah Ying realizes he is not going to die after all, he and Fatso tries their best to call off the assassination, and has to tackle not one, but 3 hitmen. The ensuing chase leads all of them to a mental hospital, where they got mixed up with various mental patients in the chaos. In the end, all the hitmen are killed and the police has arrived to deal with the chaos, but Ah Ying and Fatso have become slightly crazy as a result, with both of them starting to befriend the mental patients in the hospital.

Cast
Ricky Hui as Ah Ying
Johnny Koo as Fatso
JoJo Chan Kei-Kei as JoJo
Lam Ching-ying as knife killer

References

External links
 
 

1980 films
Hong Kong action comedy films
Films directed by John Woo
Films set in Hong Kong
Golden Harvest films